Málaga Club de Fútbol (Málaga Football Club), or simply Málaga, is a football club based in Málaga, Andalusia, Spain, that competes in the Segunda División, the second tier of the Spanish league system.

They won the UEFA Intertoto Cup in 2002 and qualified for the following season's UEFA Cup, reaching the quarter-final stages. They also qualified for the 2012–13 UEFA Champions League, where they were quarter-finalists. Since June 2010, the owner of the club has been Qatari investor Abdullah ben Nasser Al Thani.

History

Club Atlético Malagueño

Málaga's history trace back to CD Málaga, a club founded in 1904. Club Atlético Malagueño was founded on 25 May 1948 as a former reserve team of CD Málaga, after the club absorbed CD Santo Tomás with the purpose of establishing a reserve team, took over as Málaga's main team.

Club Atlético Malagueño and CD Málaga had found themselves together in the 1959–60 Tercera División after CD Málaga was relegated at the end of the 1958–59 Segunda División. As a reserve team, the former should have been relegated to regional competition. To avoid this, they separated from their parent club and registered as an independent club within the Royal Spanish Football Federation. That move made it possible for CA Malagueño to survive after CD Málaga suspended operations.

The 1992–93 season saw CA Malagueño playing in Tercera División Group 9. After a successful campaign, the club was promoted to the Segunda División B. The following season, however, the club was relegated again and, facing financial difficulties, were in danger of folding.

Name change to Málaga CF
On 19 December 1993, in a referendum, the club's members voted in favour of changing names and, on 29 June 1994, CA Malagueño changed their name to Málaga Club de Fútbol S.A.D.

In the early 2000s, Málaga were a club rich in young and top quality players, and boasted a more modern and developed stadium. Although they never pushed for a Champions League place, Málaga were always successful under the popular Joaquín Peiró.

They made a solitary appearance in the UEFA Intertoto Cup in 2002, clinching their only official trophy by beating Gent, Willem II and Villarreal. Málaga's run in the UEFA Cup was something of an overachievement, and ended in a defeat on penalties in the quarter-finals to Boavista, after beating Željezničar Sarajevo (who had been eliminated from the Champions League by Newcastle United), Amica Wronki, Leeds United (after a 2–1 win at Elland Road, courtesy of two Julio Dely Valdés goals) and AEK Athens.

After Peiró's retirement, a mass exodus slowly started. Darío Silva, Kiki Musampa, Dely Valdés and Pedro Contreras all left the club. Juande Ramos took over as coach and oversaw a 5–1 home thrashing of Barcelona, the club's biggest victory against the Catalan giants, with a hat-trick from loanee Salva Ballesta, who would end up missing out on the Pichichi Trophy by just two goals. Ramos, however, left for the Sevilla and Gregorio Manzano took charge.

Slow decline and financial issues

Despite steering Málaga to their second consecutive tenth-placed finish, Manzano could not prevent a lackluster side from being relegated, and they finished at the bottom of the league with a paltry 24 points to their name.

Málaga began the new second division season well. However, their form dipped dramatically and for two of the remaining six weeks were in the relegation zone. Málaga managed to address this situation and survived their first Segunda season.

The 2007–08 Segunda División also began impressively, with seven straight victories. Málaga seemed to be on track for promotion but, after another slump in form, they were overtaken as leaders by Numancia. They needed a victory in their final game, at home to Tenerife, to assure promotion. Two goals from Antonio Hidalgo secured a 2–1 triumph and Málaga returned to the top flight as runners-up.

Abdullah Al Thani era (2010–present)

Due to the club's economic problems, then-president Fernando Sanz found investments at Doha in Qatar to launch an ambitious project, entering in conversations with sheikh Abdullah ben Nasser Al Thani. On 11 June 2010, after a week of negotiations, Al Thani became the entity's new owner, being named president on 28 July in the members' meeting.

On 28 June 2010, Jesualdo Ferreira was appointed as coach and Moayad Shatat was appointed as vice president and general manager. Following this was the signing of prominent players like Salomón Rondón and Eliseu. In November, however, Jesualdo was fired because he had not obtained the desired performance, positioning the club in the relegation places. Later, Shatat confirmed Manuel Pellegrini as coach.

With "The Caretaker" in charge, it was decided to discard players of the squad and strengthen with players like centre back Martín Demichelis and midfielder Júlio Baptista. A record five consecutive La Liga wins, alongside a draw against Athletic Bilbao at San Mamés at the start of January 2011, helped the team maintain momentum in the league, finishing the 2010–11 season in 11th place.

In preparation for the 2011–12 season, the club signed with Nike as supplier of the club's kits. Málaga also reached a collaboration agreement with UNESCO, which, in addition, became the principal sponsor of the club's kit. The more prominent signings of that season were the Dutchman Ruud van Nistelrooy, the ex-Lyon French midfielder, Jérémy Toulalan, and the most expensive signing in the club's history, Santi Cazorla, who arrived from the Villarreal in a €21 million deal. Other less prominent players like Isco, former Spanish international midfielder Joaquín and left back Nacho Monreal, were key in the successful season which followed for the Málaga. For the first time in its history, the club qualified for the Champions League after finishing the 2011–12 La Liga campaign in fourth.
In their first ever participation in the Champions League, Málaga were paired with Italian giants Milan and reigning Belgian and Russian champions Anderlecht and Zenit Saint Petersburg, respectively. Málaga made it out of the group stage unbeaten, winning their matches against all three clubs. In the round of 16, the team drew Portuguese champions Porto, losing the first away game 1–0 while winning at home 2–0, advancing to the quarter-finals. In a highly anticipated tie against German champions Borussia Dortmund, the home game ended 0–0, leaving Malagauistas with a reasonable chance to advance on the back of a draw in the away fixture. In a second leg marked by controversial referee decisions, the scoreboard showed 1–2 at the full 90 minutes mark, seemingly ensuring Málaga's place in the semi-finals, but two late goals by Marco Reus (90+1st minute) and Felipe Santana (90+3rd minute) turned the table in favour of the home team. Immediately after the elimination, club president Abdullah ben Nasser Al Thani announced a formal complaint would be filed with UEFA and FIFA.

The following season, Málaga was banned by the UEFA, along with other clubs for its debts.  In a statement the agency declared that the club would be excluded from a subsequent competition, for which it would otherwise qualify, in the next four seasons. However, the ban was eventually downgraded to one season and the club was excluded from the 2013–14 Europa League.

In the summer of 2013, Isco was sold to Real Madrid, Joaquín to Fiorentina and midfielder Jérémy Toulalan to Monaco. The managerial position also changed, with Bernd Schuster taking over from Manuel Pellegrini.

Following 2013, Málaga encountered a steady decline that would result in them finishing in a lower position in the league each year.  On 19 April 2018, Málaga faced Levante U.D. hoping to end their run of ten consecutive defeats that left them placed 20th in LaLiga. However, fate took a turn for the worse and Málaga conceded a goal to Levante's Emmanuel Boateng in stoppage time to see the final score at 0–1. This loss meant that Málaga would be relegated to the Segunda División, ending a run of ten consecutive seasons in the top flight.

In 2019, Málaga came close to being promoted to La Liga, finishing third in the Segunda División, but was eliminated in the first round of the play-offs by Deportivo de La Coruña. For the 2019–20 Segunda División season, Víctor Sánchez del Amo will continue as coach.

In early 2020, reports emerged that club owner Sheikh Abdullah Al Thani and his family who owe Málaga €7.3m in loans and credit lines, were buying out shares from smaller shareholders to be directed to their personal expenses and business interests, yet up to February 2022 no evidence has proven any misconduct to allow the courts to rule that a criminal case is justified. . In August 2020, the court appointed administrator issued a statement that he would lay off the entire first-team squad to save the club from oblivion.

Honours

Domestic
Segunda División
 Winners (1): 1998–99
 Segunda División B
 Winners (1): 1997–98
 Tercera División
 Winners (3): 1963–64, 1992–93, 1994–95

International
UEFA Champions League
Quarter-finals (1): 2012–13
UEFA Europa League
Quarter-finals (1): 2002–03
UEFA Intertoto Cup:
 Winners (1): 2002

Friendly
Trofeo Costa del Sol
 Winners (7): 2005, 2008, 2010, 2011, 2012, 2015, 2016
Schalke 04 Cup
 Winners (1): 2014
Copa EuroAmericana
 Runner-up (1): 2015

Trofeo Costa del Sol
Between 1961 and 1983, the club organised its own summer tournament, the Trofeo Costa del Sol. In this first age of the tournament, the club won this competition themselves on three occasions, beating  Real Madrid, Red Star Belgrade and  Derby County in the finals. After a long time of inactivity from 1983 onwards, the competition was revived in 2003. Since then, the club has won the competition on seven occasions, beating Newcastle United, Real Betis, Parma, Peñarol, Everton, Lekhwiya and Sampdoria in the finals. All ten trophies are currently placed together in the Museo Malaguista in La Rosaleda.

Eastern Andalusia Derby

Málaga's main rivalry is with Granada CF, known as the Derby of eastern Andalusia. The two clubs are located approximately 90 kilometers apart.

Current squad

Reserve team

On loan

Personnel

Current technical staff

Seasons

Recent seasons

European record

Season to season
As Club Atlético Malagueño (reserve team of CD Málaga)

As an independent team

As Málaga Club de Fútbol

17 seasons in La Liga
8 seasons in Segunda División
4 seasons in Segunda División B
39 seasons in Tercera División

Stadium information
La Rosaleda Stadium

Notable players

Albania

 Keidi Bare

Algeria

 Mohamed Benkhemassa

Argentina

 Willy Caballero
 Martín Demichelis
 Javier Saviola
 Ariel Zárate

Brazil

 Júlio Baptista

Cameroon

 Carlos Kameni

Chile

 Manuel Iturra

Costa Rica

   Paulo Wanchope

Denmark
 Patrick Mtiliga

France

 Jérémy Toulalan

Mexico

 Guillermo Ochoa

Morocco

 Nordin Amrabat
 Youssef En-Nesyri
 Munir Mohamedi
 Nabil Baha

Netherlands

 Joris Mathijsen
 Ruud van Nistelrooy

Panama

 Julio Dely Valdes

Paraguay

 Roque Santa Cruz

Portugal

 Duda
 Edgar
 Eliseu

Spain

 Apoño
 Francesc Arnau
 Basti
 Francisco Bravo
 Javier Calleja
 Ignacio Camacho
 Santi Cazorla
 Pedro Contreras
 Jesús Gámez
 Gerardo
 Luis Hernández
 Antonio Hidalgo
 Fernando Hierro
 Isco
 Joaquín
 Juanito
 Domingo Larrainzar
 Albert Luque
 Miguel Ángel
 Nacho Monreal
 José María Movilla
 Recio
 Miguel Ángel Roteta
 Francisco Rufete
 Salva Ballesta
 Sergio Sánchez
 Sandro
 Fernando Sanz
 Vicente Valcarce
 Manuel Velázquez
 Esteban Vigo

Uruguay

 Sebastián Fernández
 Marcelo Romero
 Darío Silva

Venezuela

 Juanpi
 Salomón Rondón
 Roberto Rosales

Previous coaches

 Abdallah Ben Barek (1969–70)
 Antonio Benítez (1976–979)
 Ricardo Albis (1994)
 Antonio Benítez (1994–95)
 Pepe Cayuela (1996)
 Ricardo Albis (1997)
 Ismael Díaz (1997–98)
 Joaquín Peiró (1 July 1998 – 16 June 2003)
 Juande Ramos (1 July 2003 – 14 June 2004)
 Gregorio Manzano (2004–05)
 Antonio Tapia (12 January 2005 – 30 January 2006)
 Manolo Hierro (2006)
 Marcos (2006)
 Juan Muñiz (2006–08)
 Antonio Tapia (1 July 2008 – 30 June 2009)		
 Juan Muñiz (2009–10)
 Jesualdo Ferreira (2010)
 Rafa Gil (interim) (2010)
 Manuel Pellegrini (5 November 2010 – 23 June 2013)
 Bernd Schuster (12 June 2013 – 16 May 2014)
 Javi Gracia (1 July 2014 – 24 May 2016)
 Juande Ramos (27 May 2016 – 27 December 2016)
 Marcelo Romero (28 December 2016 – 6 March 2017)
 Míchel (7 March 2017 – 13 January 2018)
 José González (13 January 2018 – 20 June 2018)
 Juan Muñiz (20 June 2018 – 14 April 2019)
 Víctor Sánchez (15 April 2019 – 11 January 2020)
 Sergio Pellicer (11 January 2020 – 31 May 2021)
 José Alberto (1 June 2021 – 24 January 2022)

See also
 Atlético Malagueño
 CD Málaga
 Trofeo Costa del Sol
 Football in Spain

References

External links

  
 Málaga CF at La Liga 
 Málaga CF at UEFA 

 
Segunda División clubs
Football clubs in Andalusia
Sport in Málaga
Association football clubs established in 1948
1948 establishments in Spain
La Liga clubs
UEFA Intertoto Cup winning clubs